Karamay District is a district within the Xinjiang Uyghur Autonomous Region and is under the administrative jurisdiction of Karamay City. It contains an area of 5,351 km2. According to the 2002 census, it has a population of 150,000.

County-level divisions of Xinjiang